Elva Lilian Bett  (née Brown, 30 March 1918 – 6 December 2016) was a New Zealand artist, art historian and art gallery director. Her work is held in the Museum of New Zealand Te Papa Tongarewa.

Biography 
Bett was born Elva Lilian Brown in Dunedin, New Zealand, on 30 March 1918, the daughter of Lily May Marion Brown and Herbert Patrick Flowerdew Brown. In 1940, she became engaged to John James Bett, and the couple later married. 

An artist in her own right, Bett focused on painting and printmaking and considered herself a purist: "When all is said and done, I think there is a content in painting which goes beyond just the pictorial or the gimmicky or the adventuresome or the experimental". Bett was an artist member New Zealand Academy of Fine Arts and an honourable member New Zealand Print Council.

In the 1960s, Bett was based in Wellington where she was a director at the Centre Gallery. In 1964 she curated an exhibition of women's art at the National Art Gallery, entitled A Room of One's Own: Women in New Zealand Art. 

In 1968, Bett and her business partner Catherine Duncan opened the Bett-Duncan Gallery on Cuba Street, where they exhibited works of promising and established artists, and Bett held art classes. Early exhibitions included pottery by Doreen Blumhardt and prints by Greer Twiss and Hamish Keith. In 1976, Duncan left the gallery which subsequently became the Elva Bett Gallery. The gallery exhibited art by emerging artists such as Tony Fomison, Philip Clairmont, and Allen Maddox. 

In the 1980s, Betts focus shifted from gallery work to writing and she went on to publish two books including Drawing and Painting: a complete study course for New Zealanders (1984).

In the 1988 New Year Honours, Bett was awarded the Queen's Service Medal for community service. She died in Paraparaumu on 6 December 2016.

Publications 
 Drawing and Painting: A Complete Study Course for New Zealanders. Wellington: Reed, 1984.
 New Zealand Art: A Modern Perspective. Auckland: Reed Methuen, 1986.

References

1918 births
2016 deaths
Writers from Dunedin
New Zealand non-fiction writers
New Zealand art dealers
Recipients of the Queen's Service Medal
New Zealand women artists
Artists from Dunedin